Matt Vane (born 22 February 1961) is  a former Australian rules footballer who played with St Kilda in the Victorian Football League (VFL).

Notes

External links 		
		
		
		
		
		
		
Living people		
1961 births		
		
Australian rules footballers from Victoria (Australia)		
St Kilda Football Club players